Dirk Hoogendam, a.k.a. Dieter Hohendamm, alias The Boxer (18 May 1922, Vlaardingen - 8 August 2003 in Ringgau, Germany), was a Dutch war criminal.

Hoogendam was sentenced to death after World War II because of his service in a foreign army (the German SS) and severe mistreatment of prisoners in Drenthe during the war. The sentence was later commuted to life imprisonment. In 1946 however, Hoogendam escaped and fled to Germany, and only a few years before his death, the Dutch paper De Telegraaf discovered that he was living in Ringgau under the name of Hohendamm.

Just before his death, the Netherlands asked the German government to prosecute him, together with five other in Germany living war criminals. Subsequently, the German Justice department announced that one of them, Herbertus Bikker, was to appear for court on 8 September 2003 for his part in the murder of Dutch resistance member Jan Houtman.

References

1922 births
2003 deaths
Dutch people of World War II
People from Vlaardingen